The Indiana Senate is the upper house of the Indiana General Assembly, the state legislature of the U.S. state of Indiana. The Senate is composed of 50 members representing an equal number of constituent districts. Senators serve four-year terms without term limits. According to the 2010 U.S. census, the average state senator represents 129,676 people.

The Senate convenes at the Indiana Statehouse in Indianapolis, Indiana.

History
The Indiana Senate was established in 1816 along with the Indiana House of Representatives in 1816, when Indiana became a state. In 1897, the Indiana House passed a bill rounding the value of pi to 3.2. However, the intervention of State Senator Orrin Hubbel postponed the voting of the bill indefinitely, effectively rejecting it.

Operating rules

The Indiana State Senate is operated according to a set of internal regulations developed and maintained largely by tradition. These rules are similar to the rules that govern the upper house most of the state senates in the United States. The Senate convenes its annual session the first Tuesday following the first Monday of January every year. In odd numbered years the senate must meet for 61 days (not necessarily consecutive days), and must adjourn no later than April 30. This is typically called a long session. In even numbered years, when elections are held, the Senate must meet for 30 days (not necessarily consecutive days) and adjourn no later than March 15. This is typically called the short session. The only time the senate may convene outside of these dates is if the governor calls a special assembly.

The senate must convene by 1:30 pm each day a session is scheduled. Two thirds of the senators must be present for the session to begin. Senators must be present at each session unless they are explicitly excused by the president-pro-tempore. Members who are not present can be forced to attend the session or be censured and expelled from the body.

The lieutenant governor of Indiana serves as the president of the Senate and is responsible for ensuring that the senate rules are followed by its members. The president of the Senate takes no part in the debates of the senate and may only vote to break ties. The senate also elects a president-pro-tempore, a majority leader, and a minority leader. The president-pro-tempore is typically a senior member of majority party. The president-pro-tempore presides over the senate whenever the president of the Senate is not present. The president-pro-tempore is largely responsible for setting the agenda of the senate.

When debate occurs in the senate, each senator is granted permission to speak on each issue once. A senator may not speak on an issue more than once without a permission from the rest of the senate, which is attained with a senate vote. A senator can speak for no longer than a half-hour at any one time and may be silenced by a majority vote at any time during his or her speech.

Terms
Article 4 of the Constitution of Indiana places several limitation on the size and composition of the senate.

The senate can contain no more than 50 members.
The term of a senator lasts four years with 25 senators being elected every two years.
There is no limit to how many terms a senator may be elected.

Qualifications
Article 4 of the Constitution of Indiana states the qualifications to become a senator.

The candidate must be a United States citizen for a minimum of two years prior to his or her candidacy.
The candidate has to reside in the district which he or she seeks to represent for one year.
The candidate should be at least 25 years of age when sworn into office.
The candidate cannot hold any other public office in the state or federal government during a senate term.

Composition of the Senate

2022–2023 officers

Members of the Indiana Senate

†Member was originally appointed or won the seat in a special election.

Committees

The Senate has various committees that are charged with overseeing different areas of the state government and drafting legislation. These committees are bipartisan and contain between three and eleven members split between the parties according to their ratio of members in the Senate. Each committee chairman is a member of the majority party. The committees as of 2023 were:

Past composition of the Senate

See also

Indiana House of Representatives
Government of Indiana

Notes

External links
Indiana General Assembly

State Senate of Indiana at Project Vote Smart
Indiana Senate Democratic Caucus alternate website
Indiana Senate Republicans

Indiana General Assembly
State upper houses in the United States
 
1816 establishments in Indiana